Warnes is a town in Bolivia, named after Colonel Ignacio Warnes, a military leader in the South American war of independence. It is located 24 kilometers north of Santa Cruz de la Sierra.

References

  Instituto Nacional de Estadística

External links 
 Map of Ignacio Warnes Province

Populated places in Santa Cruz Department (Bolivia)